The Guatemalan Red Cross (Spanish: La Sociedad Nacional de la Cruz Roja Guatemalteca) was founded on April 22, 1923. It is headquartered in Guatemala City in Guatemala. Like other national Red Cross and Red Crescent chapters, the Guatemalan Red Cross is a non-profit whose mission is to provide assistance to people in at risk or affected by conflict, disaster and other crisis situations.

See also 

 List of Red Cross and Red Crescent Societies
 International Red Cross and Red Crescent Movement

References

External links 
Guatemalan Red Cross website

Organizations established in 1923
Red Cross and Red Crescent national societies
Non-profit organizations based in Guatemala
Medical and health organizations based in Guatemala